Clarissa Bonet (born 1986) is an American artist and photographer. 

Her work is included in the collections of the Museum of Fine Arts, Houston, and
the Museum of Contemporary Photography.

In 2019 she won the Hasselblad X You Grand Prize.

References

—

Living people
1986 births
20th-century American women artists
21st-century American women artists
20th-century American photographers
21st-century American photographers